Jan Petelin (born 2 July 1996) is an Luxembourgish cyclist, who last rode for UCI ProTeam .

Major results
2016
 National Under-23 Road Championships
2nd Road race
3rd Time trial
 8th Road race, National Road Championships
 10th Eschborn–Frankfurt Under–23
2017
 7th Road race, National Road Championships
 9th Tour de Berne
 10th Duo Normand
2018
 4th Road race, National Under-23 Road Championships
2019
 National Road Championships
7th Road race
7th Time trial

References

External links

1996 births
Living people
Luxembourgian male cyclists
Sportspeople from Luxembourg City